Aberystruth was an ancient ecclesiastical parish in Wales, located beside the north-west corner of the county of Monmouthshire against the border with Breconshire and between the parishes of Bedwellty and Trevethin. It extended from Beaufort in the north beyond Abertillery in the south.

Blaina
The parish church located near the centre of the parish in the village of Blaina and dedicated to St Peter, was first built about the year 1500 and that building lasted more than 320 years.

Following a fire  which destroyed the original St Peter's  another church was built on the site, the opening services being held on 4 December 1856; this was demolished in 1966. The present St Peter's Blaina dates from the late 1960s and today forms part of a larger ministry area served by clergy headed by the Rector of Ebbw Vale.

Aberystruth remained the official ecclesiastical name of the parish into the 1980s. Clergy were styled Rector of Aberystruth (Blaina) in Crockford's Clerical Directory but it had been obsolete in all other usages for decades. An attempt in recent years to restore the name for a ministry area which would have linked the Abertillery and Blaina parishes under one heading did not, in the end, succeed.

Industry
Development of Aberystruth's coal and iron ore deposits in the early nineteenth century brought explosive growth to Abertillery and Nantyglo and its new suburb of Brynmawr.

Aberystruth is now the eastern portion of the county borough of Blaenau Gwent

Parish bounds and Brynmawr
The 19th century settlement of Brynmawr spanned the original boundary of Monmouthshire (parish of Aberystruth) and Breconshire (parishes of Llanelly and Llangattock). At the southern end of Boundary Street Brynmawr you may still find the Boundary Stone marking the point where the three parishes met.

References

External links
 A remarkable History of Aberystruth by David James
 Kelly's Directory 1901

History of Blaenau Gwent
Geography of Blaenau Gwent